"Play a Love Song" is a song by Japanese-American singer-songwriter Hikaru Utada. It is their fourth single under the label Epic Records Japan, from their seventh Japanese-language studio album Hatsukoi. The song was released as a digital download on April 25, 2018 and was being used as a tie-in for Tennensui Suntory Water.

Commercial performance
On April 25, the first day of its chart run on the Oricon Digital Download Songs Chart, it debuted at #1 with 13,713 copies. On the two days, it remained at the #1 position, selling 5,721 and 4,921 copies respectively. The song reached #1 in 5 domestic services and #1 in iTunes in 6 international countries around Asia, such as the Philippines and Taiwan.

Track listing

Charts

Weekly charts

Sales and certifications

Release history

References

Hikaru Utada songs
Songs written by Hikaru Utada
2018 songs
2018 singles